Mediaset Extra is an Italian entertainment television channel, operated by the media company Mediaset and owned by MFE - MediaForEurope, launched on 26 November 2010.

It is broadcast in Italy on DTT channel 34 on mux Mediaset 2.

The channel programming mainly consists of reruns of Mediaset's channels.

On 12 June 2018, a temporary HD feed of the channel launched on Tivùsat for the 2018 FIFA World Cup and closed on 1 August 2018. On 11 July 2019, another simulcast channel called Mediaset Extra 2 was launched on terrestrial replacing Cine Sony. This simulcasts Mediaset Extra during the day and then airs its own programming at night. The channel was replaced by Cine34 in January 2020.

Programming

TV shows
Generally, Mediaset Extra repeats the cult programs in the past and present of general Mediaset channels, but there are some programs created for this channel:
Extrashow
Extra Comics
Extra Week
Maurizio Costanzo Show - La Storia

Telenovelas
 Pasión Morena
 Amore senza tempo
 Dolce Valentina
 Il segreto
 Gabriela

Soap operas
 The Bold and the Beautiful

See also
Television in Italy	 
Mediaset

References

External links
Official site

Italian-language television stations
Mediaset television channels
Television channels and stations established in 2010
Mediaset